The 13th International Film Festival of India was held as IFFI' 90 during 10–20 January 1990 at the Empire Theatre in Kolkata. The festival was made interim non-competitive following a decision taken in August 1988 by the Ministry of Information and Broadcasting. The "Filmotsavs" and IFFI 90-91-92 together constituted 23 editions of the festival

Non-competitive sections
Cinema of The World
Indian Panorama – Feature Films
Indian Panorama – Non-Feature Films
Indian Panorama – Mainstream Films

References

1990 film festivals
13th
1990 in Indian cinema